Bithuja is a village in Balotra taluk, Barmer district, Rajasthan, India.

References

Villages in Barmer district